Landshapes are a British band formed in 2012, known primarily for its effects-heavy psychedelic alternative rock. They released their debut full-length album Rambutan on indie record label Bella Union in 2013 and their second album, Heyoon, in May 2015. The group consists of Heloise Tunstall-Behrens (vocals, violin) and Luisa Gerstein (vocals, ukulele) with Jemma Freeman (guitar, vocals) and Dan Blackett (drums, vocals). They were formerly known as Lulu and the Lampshades and they met when its members were at the University of Bristol.

Band members Tunstall-Behrens and Gerstein are known for their revival of the 1931 Carter Family song "When I'm Gone" as "Cups".

While Landshapes was on hiatus, Gerstein and Tunstall-Behrens remained active with Deep Throat Choir, releasing an album on Bella Union in 2017, and now perform with Blood Moon Project. Freeman formed Jemma Freeman and the Cosmic Something, releasing a debut EP in 2017 and a debut album in 2019.

Discography

Lulu and the Lampshades 
 2009: "Feet To The Sky" / "Rose Tint" (Single, Voga Parochia)
 2011: "Cold Water" / "Cups" ("You're Gonna Miss Me") (Single, Moshi Moshi)
 2011: "Cold Water" (EP, Moshi Moshi)

Landshapes 
 2013: Rambutan (Album, Bella Union)
 2013: "Insomniacs Club" (Single, Bella Union)
 2015: Heyoon (Album, Bella Union)
 2020:  Contact (Album, Bella Union)

References

External links
Allmusic bio

British alternative rock groups
Bella Union artists
Musical groups from Bristol